Alexandar Protogerov (Bulgarian: Александър Протогеров) (28 February 1867, Ohrid – 7 July 1928, Sofia) was a Bulgarian general, politician and revolutionary, as well as a member of the revolutionary movement in Macedonia, Thrace and Pomoravlje. Protogerov was a Bulgarian Freemason and held a leading position (Grand Master) in the lodge where he was a member.

In North Macedonia Protogerov, who had been dismissed as Greater Bulgarian chauvinist by the Macedonian historiography in Communist Yugoslavia, has been recently added to the country's historical heritage, already as an ethnic Macedonian.

Biography 

Protogerov was born in 1867 in Ohrid, then in the Ottoman Empire. Later he graduated there with his primary education in the local Bulgarian Exarchate school. On 5 October 1882 he entered the Military School in Sofia and as a cadet was a volunteer in the Serbo-Bulgarian War (1885). In 1887 he graduated from the Military School and was assigned to the infantry. On 18 May 1890 he was already a lieutenant. On 2 August 1894 he became a captain and served as an adjutant in the 1st Brigade of the 5th Danube Infantry Division. He served in Rousse, where he was the leader of the Bulgarian Officer Brotherhoods. Later he served as a company commander of the 32nd Zagore Infantry Regiment. He was among the leaders of the Supreme Macedonian-Adrianople Committee. Protogerov took part in the Gorna Dzhumaya uprising in 1902 and in the Ilinden-Preobrazhenie Uprising. Later joined the  Internal Macedonian Revolutionary Organization.

In the Balkan Wars, Protogerov was one of the organizers of the Macedonian-Adrianopolitan Volunteer Corps and Assistant Commander of this military unit. During the First World War, he commanded the Third Infantry Brigade of the 11th Macedonian Infantry Division and then became commander of the Bulgarian troops in the Pomoravlje region of Serbia. There he suppressed the Toplica Uprising, commanding an army that committed a large number of war crimes, including cruel murders of thousands of women, children and the elderly. Later, as commandant of Sofia, Protogerov suppressed the Bulgarian soldier's uprising. After World War I, Protogerov was elected as one of the leaders of IMRO. In 1924, IMRO entered negotiations with the Comintern about collaboration between the communists and the Macedonian movement and the creation of a united Macedonian movement. Protogerov and Petar Chaulev probably signed the so-called May Manifesto about forming a Balkan Communist Federation and cooperation with the Soviet Union in Vienna. Later, Protogerov denied through the Bulgarian press that they had ever signed any agreements, claiming that the May Manifesto was a communist forgery. Shortly after, Todor Alexandrov was assassinated in unclear circumstances and IMRO came under the leadership of Ivan Mihailov, who became a powerful figure in Bulgarian politics. In 1925 Protogerov was injured in result of the organized by the communists St Nedelya Church assault. In IMRO itself, a major split arose between Mihailov's wing, supported by Andrey Lyapchev, and Protogerov's wing, supported by Aleksandar Tsankov. The faction led by Protogerov opted for continuing with the tactics of guerrilla warfare, while this led by Mihailov insisted on individual terrorist attacks. The result of this split and communists conspiracies was further strife within the organisation and several high-profile murders, including that of Protogetov himself.

Military Awards 
 Soldier's Cross of Bravery III grade, Bulgaria
 Military Order of Bravery III grade, Bulgaria
 Royal Order of St. Alexander III grade with swords in the middle, Bulgaria
 People's Order of Military Merit III grade on military ribbon, Bulgaria

References

Sources
 Вазов, В., Животописни бележки, София, 1992, Военноиздателски комплекс „Св. Георги Победоносец“, с.123

See also
Internal Macedonian Revolutionary Organization

1867 births
1928 deaths
People from Ohrid
Bulgarian revolutionaries
Members of the Internal Macedonian Revolutionary Organization
Bulgarian generals
People of the Serbo-Bulgarian War
Bulgarian military personnel of the Balkan Wars
Bulgarian military personnel of World War I
Recipients of the Order of Bravery
Recipients of the Order of Military Merit (Bulgaria)
Assassinated Bulgarian politicians
Assassinated military personnel
Macedonian Bulgarians
People murdered in Bulgaria
20th-century Bulgarian politicians
Recipients of the Iron Cross (1914), 2nd class
Deaths by firearm in Bulgaria
Bulgarian Freemasons